CSG may refer to:

Companies 
CSG International, an American company providing business support systems and services
CSG Limited an Australian ICT company
Canada Systems Group,  data processing service bureaus
Commodore Semiconductor Group, formerly MOS Technology
Commuter Security Group, Solna, Sweden
China Shipping Group, Chinese shipping conglomerate
Czechoslovak Group, a Czech holding company in aviation, railway, defense industry.

Military 
Conseil supérieur de la guerre, French military organization
Carrier strike group, an operational formation of the US Navy
Corps Support Group, a brigade-sized unit in the United States Army

Organizations 
Camden School for Girls, in London, England
Columbus School for Girls, in Ohio, United States
Canadian Senators Group, a parliamentary group
Centrum Schwule Geschichte (Gay History Center), Cologne, Germany
Citizens for Self-Governance, a US political organization
Common Sense Group, a UK political organisation
The Council of State Governments, a United States non-profit organization

Science and technology 
Coal seam gas, from coal beds
Constructive solid geometry, a technique used in solid modeling
Constructible strategy game, type of tabletop strategy game
Context-sensitive grammar, a formal grammar
Crystalline silicon on glass, see Polycrystalline silicon photovoltaics#Novel ideas for polycrystalline silicon
Haeco-CSG, an obsolete audio signal processing technology

Other uses 
 csg, the ISO 639 code for the Chilean Sign Language
Centre Spatial Guyanais (Guiana Space Centre), near Kourou, rocket launch site
Columbus Metropolitan Airport (Georgia), US, IATA code
Deji Olatunji, an English video game commentator and comedian on YouTube known as Comedy Shorts Gamer
Commonwealth Secretary-General